Puls 2 is a Polish free-to-air television channel that was launched on 19 July 2012. Its sister channel is TV Puls, which started broadcasting in 2001.

History
The channel started broadcasting on 19 July 2012 at noon. Its initial programming consisted of lifestyle programmes, talk shows, music programmes and movies, TV series and cartoons. From 19 July 2012 to 31 January 2013, Puls 2 broadcast from 12:00 p.m. to 12:00 a.m. From 1 to 28 February 2013, it increased its airtime to 6:00 a.m. until 12:00 a.m. As of 1 March 2013, Puls 2 extended the broadcasting time again, this time until 2:00 pm, and from March 4 the channel broadcast until 3:00 pm. On 1 July 2013, the channel started broadcasting 24 hours a day.

References

External links
 

Television channels in Poland
Television channels and stations established in 2012
2012 establishments in Poland
Polish-language television stations
Mass media in Warsaw